John Sayer ( – 2 October 1818) was an early Canadian fur trader. He was one of the earliest traders working out of Fort Michilimackinac to winter in the Leech Lake, Minnesota area. During the winter of 1804–1805, he wintered along the Snake River (St. Croix River tributary) near present-day Pine City, Minnesota, where he helped establish the North West Company at the site of present-day Snake River Fur Post.

References

External links 
Biography at the Dictionary of Canadian Biography Online

Canadian fur traders
1818 deaths
People from Pine City, Minnesota
Year of birth uncertain
Year of birth unknown
1750 births